Elmer Lee Gentry (December 1, 1918 – December 19, 1992) was an American football running back in the National Football League for the Washington Redskins.  He played college football at the University of Tulsa and was drafted in the 22nd round of the 1941 NFL Draft.

Gentry graduated from Shawnee High School in 1937 where he was an All-state football player. At the University of Tulsa he was named MVP in the East-West All-Star game and drafted by the Washington Redskins in the 22nd round. His pro football career was cut short by World War II.

1918 births
1992 deaths
American football running backs
Sportspeople from Shawnee, Oklahoma
Players of American football from Oklahoma
Tulsa Golden Hurricane football players
Washington Redskins players